The 72nd Assembly District of Wisconsin is one of 99 districts in the Wisconsin State Assembly.  Located in central Wisconsin, the district comprises the northern half of Adams County and the western half of Waushara County, as well as part of southern Portage County and southeastern Wood County.  It contains the cities of Wisconsin Rapids and Wautoma, as well as the villages of Biron, Coloma, Hancock, Plainfield, Port Edwards, and Wild Rose, and the Roche-a-Cri State Park. The district is represented by Republican Scott Krug, since January 2011.

The 72nd Assembly District is located within Wisconsin's 24th Senate district, along with the 70th and 71st Assembly districts.

List of past representatives

References 

Wisconsin State Assembly districts
Adams County, Wisconsin
Portage County, Wisconsin
Waushara County, Wisconsin
Wood County, Wisconsin